Nicola Tallant (born 1973 or 1974) is an Irish investigative journalist, specialising in organised crime. She is known for her work at the Sunday World.

Background
Tallant studied at the College of Commerce, Rathmines in the 1990s, graduating with a certificate in journalism. She undertook work experience at the Southside News and the Evening Press newspapers. Tallant has a higher diploma in criminology.

Career
Tallant began her career with local newspapers, working part-time as a waitress. She later worked shifts at the Evening Herald, the Irish Independent, and Irish Daily Star. At the age of 26, Tallant was appointed News Editor at the Irish Daily Mirror, from 1999 to 2001. From 2001 to 2008, she was co-owner of News Ireland news agency. She began working for the Sunday World in 2008. Since 2010, Tallant is Investigations Editor at the Sunday World. She has been awarded Irish Crime Journalist of the Year three times.

Since November 2020, she hosts, edits, and produces the weekly Crime World podcast. In May 2021, she released a 10-part podcast on Acast called The Witness: In His Own Words, based on her best-selling book The Witness. The Witness was named Podcast of the Year at the 2021 Irish Journalism Awards and at the 2021 Digital Media Awards.

In October 2022 it was reported Tallant's Crime World podcast was listened to over 1 million times in a month.

Bibliography
 Clash of the Clans (2021)
 The Witness (2020)

References

Living people
Irish women journalists
Irish investigative journalists
Year of birth uncertain
Year of birth missing (living people)